Shajapur Lok Sabha constituency was a Lok Sabha constituency in Madhya Pradesh state in central India. This constituency was reserved for the candidates belonging to the Scheduled Castes from 1976 to 2008. This constituency covered the entire Shajapur district and part of Dewas district.

Vidhan Sabha segments
From 1976-2008, Shajapur Lok Sabha constituency comprised the following eight Vidhan Sabha (Legislative Assembly) segments:

Agar, Shajapur, Shujalpur, Dewas, Sonkatch and Hatpipalya Vidhan Sabha segments are currently part of Dewas Lok Sabha constituency. Susner is part of Rajgarh constituency and Gulana was abolished in 2008.

Members of Lok Sabha 

The constituency ceased to exist when Lok Sabha seats map for Madhya Pradesh was redrawn in 2008.

References
Election Commission of India -http://www.eci.gov.in/StatisticalReports/ElectionStatistics.asp

See also
 Dewas Lok Sabha constituency
 Shajapur district
 List of Constituencies of the Lok Sabha

Shajapur district
Former Lok Sabha constituencies of Madhya Pradesh
2008 disestablishments in India
Constituencies disestablished in 2008
Former constituencies of the Lok Sabha